Doug Duffey is a singer, songwriter, pianist, bandleader, music arranger, record producer, music publisher, poet, diarist, photographer and visual artist. From Monroe, Louisiana, Doug Duffey was inducted into the "Louisiana Hall of Fame" in April, 2001 and inducted into the National Blues Hall of Fame in 2009.

Personal information

Duffey was inducted into the Louisiana Hall of Fame in 2001 and inducted into the National Blues Hall of Fame in 2009. With his Blues Hall of Fame induction he was also named as a "Louisiana Ambassador of the Blues". Born in Monroe, Louisiana in 1950, Duffey began singing and playing piano at an early age; he was composing and performing professionally by age 14.

His first single, recorded in Nashville in 1970, was chosen by Billboard, Cashbox and Record World as "Pick Hit" and broke into the top 100 charts.

He moved to Hollywood In his early 20s where he was managed by Backstage Management. He has written songs for and/or recorded with George Clinton, Funkadelic, Rare Earth, Bootsy Collins, Bernie Worrell, Keith Richards, Herbie Hancock, David Byrne, Maceo Parker, Fred Wesley, Anders Osborne, Leigh Harris aka "Little Queenie", Marcia Ball, Zakiya Hooker, Jerry Beach, John Autin, and other Louisiana and International artists.

He has been called "one of the most prolific songwriters living in Louisiana" and has recorded 11 critically acclaimed cds of original material to date. His vast multi genre catalog of material contains not only songs, but instrumental and improvisational works, as well. A poetic lyricist, his songs are intelligent, intellectual, sophisticated and soulful, whether solo or with full production; on record or performed live.

Living and working off and on in New Orleans from the 1960s - 1990s, he absorbed that city's Jazz and Funk musical styles and mixed them with his own North Louisiana Mississippi Delta roots: Delta Blues, Louisiana Rock and Roll, Memphis Soul and Gospel.
Incorporating traditional Louisiana piano styles with his own improvisational style, his inimitable soulful voice, Doug Duffey has entertained audiences internationally, promoting both traditional and his own original Louisiana Music for 4+ decades. Onstage, he serves up a steaming hot and spicy gumbo of Louisiana soul, whether solo or with his International Soul Band.

In the early 1990s he 1st toured Europe and has been performing between there and Louisiana, since. He has appeared many times at the New Orleans Jazz and Heritage Festival [solo and with band] since the late 1970s; has performed at the Louisiana Folklife Festival, Montreal Jazz Festival, Heineken Jazz Festival and many other major International music festivals, the best concert halls and music venues in the US and Europe. He has appeared on television, radio, interviews, and global live Internet broadcasts.

His career spans over 55 years and has carried him from his native Louisiana to International success.

Career
He has recorded with, or on records by, George Clinton, Bernie Worrell, Funkadelic, Bootsy Collins, Eddie Hazel, Beverly Jo Scott, Fred Wesley, Maceo Parker, Nicky Hopkins, Anders Osborne, Leigh "Little Queenie" Harris, and many others. He has written songs with George Clinton, written songs for Marcia Ball, Rare Earth, Zakiya Hooker, Jerry Beach, and many more.

A multifaceted visual artist, as well as musical one, Doug Duffey has exhibited his photographs, collages, drawings and paintings in galleries in the US and Europe. He is a member of the 10-20-40 art group. He resides and performs in both the US and Europe.

References

External links
 Official Web Site
 Doug Duffy at the Blues Hall of Fame
 Doug Duffy at CDBaby

1950 births
Living people
Musicians from Monroe, Louisiana
American singer-songwriters
American male singer-songwriters